Tetrapleura chevalieri is a species of tree in the pea family found in western tropical Africa. It is used for its wood.

References

Mimosoids
Flora of West Tropical Africa